Dokka may refer to:

People
Dokka Manikya Vara Prasad (born 1962), an Indian politician
Dokka Seethamma (1841–1909), an Indian woman who gained recognition by spending much of her life serving food for poor people and travellers
Dokka Umarov (1964-2013), a Chechen mujahid 
Johan Dokka (1881-1972), a Norwegian politician
Karen Dokka (born 1947), a Canadian former alpine skier who competed in the 1964 Winter Olympics and in the 1968 Winter Olympics

Places
Dokka, a village in Nordre Land municipality in Innlandet county, Norway
Dokka Station, a former railway station in Nordre Land municipality in Innlandet county, Norway

Other
Dokka language, an Afro-Asiatic language spoken in Ethiopia
Ekka Dokka, a drama show that premiered on Bengali general entertainment channel Star Jalsha in 2022